Wudaoliang railway station is a crossing loop on the China Railway line to Lhasa in Tibet.

Climate 
Wudaoliang has a tundra climate (Köppen climate classification ET) with long, frigid, very dry winters and short, cool, less dry summers.

Station layout 

The station has a crossing loop and a few sidings shuntable in the Lhasa-bound direction.

A subway at the Lhasa end is provided for road traffic, rather than a level crossing.

References

Stations on the Qinghai–Tibet Railway
Railway stations in Qinghai